Sylvana van Hees (born 4 April 1993) is a Dutch wheelchair basketball player (1.5 disability class) and a member of the Netherlands women's national wheelchair basketball team and Rotterdam Basketball. She won the gold medal at the 2020 Summer Paralympics, with the national team.

Career 
After a clinic she started with playing wheelchair basketball in Middelburg when she was 16 years old. After playing wheelchair basketball she lost 23 kilograms in one year. She weighed 120 kilograms in 2012 and decided to have a stomach reduction and helped her to lose a total of 70 kilograms. Currently she trains at the national Olympic training centre Papendal.

When she was two years old, she contracted meningitis and both her legs and her right forearm had to be amputated. She studied leisure management at the Rotterdam University of Applied Sciences.

She plays in the Dutch Eredivisie national league, with her club Rotterdam Basketball.

References

1993 births
Living people
Dutch women's wheelchair basketball players
Sportspeople from Roosendaal
Paralympic wheelchair basketball players of the Netherlands
Wheelchair basketball players at the 2020 Summer Paralympics
Medalists at the 2020 Summer Paralympics
Paralympic medalists in wheelchair basketball
Paralympic gold medalists for the Netherlands
21st-century Dutch women